Xavier Fernandez (born 19 November 1972) is an alpine skier who represented Andorra at the 2014 Winter Paralympics. He also competed in the 2010 Winter Paralympics.

References 

Paralympic alpine skiers of Andorra
Alpine skiers at the 2010 Winter Paralympics
Alpine skiers at the 2014 Winter Paralympics
1972 births
Living people
Andorran male alpine skiers